Bang Lang Reservoir is a reservoir in Bannang Sata District, Yala Province, southern Thailand. The reservoir is on the Pattani River.

The reservoir's dam, Bang Lang Dam, is 85 metres high with a crest of 422 metres long, and the reservoir has a capacity of 1,420 million cubic metres. It is used for irrigation and flood control as well as to produce 72 MW of electricity.

History
Construction of the dam was approved on 3 April 1973. Construction started in July 1976. In June 1981 the dam was completed. It was officially inaugurated on 27 September 1981 by Princess Maha Chakri Sirindhorn.

The reservoir submerged the village of Ban Toh. In 2016, declining water levels caused the village remains to resurface.

References

External links
Bang Lang Reservoir by EGAT (Thai)

Reservoirs in Thailand
Geography of Yala province